The Constant Camber 37 is a trimaran sailboat designed by John Marples in the 1980s.

See also
 List of multihulls

References

Trimarans